Melvin Leon Stottlemyre Jr. (born December 28, 1963) is an American professional baseball pitching coach and a former right-handed pitcher in Major League Baseball, who played for the Kansas City Royals.

Amateur career
Stottlemyre attended the University of Nevada-Las Vegas, and in 1984 he played collegiate summer baseball with the Harwich Mariners of the Cape Cod Baseball League.

Professional career

Houston Astros
Stottlemyre was selected in the 1982 Major League Baseball draft by the Seattle Mariners, but did not sign. He was later drafted in the January Secondary 1985 Major League Baseball draft by the Houston Astros. In his first year, he went 5–4 with a 2.75 earned run average (ERA) in 14 games, 13 starts.

In , Stottlemyre split the season between the Class-A Asheville Tourists and the Class-A Osceola Astros. He went 3–1 with a 2.10 ERA in seven games, all starts. With Osceola, Stottlemyre went 0–7 with a 7.82 ERA in nine games, eight starts. This gave him a combined record of 3–8 with a 5.01 ERA on the year.

Stottlemyre began the  season with the Double-A Columbus Astros of the Southern League. He was traded by the Astros to the Kansas City Royals on July 29,  for Buddy Biancalana.

Kansas City Royals
After the trade, Stottlemyre was assigned to the Double-A Memphis Chicks of the Southern League. He went a combined 7–6 with a 4.31 ERA in 20 games, all starts.

He played the  season with the Double-A Memphis Chicks. He went 3–2 with a 2.40 ERA in seven games, all starts.

Coaching career
Stottlemyre began his coaching career while with the University of Nevada-Las Vegas, serving as their pitching coach.

On May 7, Stottlemyre was hired as the pitching coach for the Arizona Diamondbacks. He was released as pitching coach after the 2010 season, but remained in the D-backs' organization as a roving minor-league pitching instructor.  On December 2, 2013, he returned to the Diamondbacks' Major League staff as bullpen coach under manager Kirk Gibson.

On October 26, Stottlemyre was announced as the new pitching coach for the Seattle Mariners during manager Scott Servais' inaugural press conference. He replaced Rick Waits, who was hired after the 2013 season.

In December 2018, Stottlemyre was hired as pitching coach for the Miami Marlins.

In October 2021, Stottlemyre revealed that he had been diagnosed with prostate cancer in February of the same year. Stottlemyre had his prostate removed in October and announced that he still planned to coach the 2022 season.

See also
List of second-generation Major League Baseball players

References

External links

1963 births
Living people
Arizona Diamondbacks coaches
Asheville Tourists players
Baseball City Royals players
Baseball players from Washington (state)
Columbus Astros players
Harwich Mariners players
Kansas City Royals players
Major League Baseball bullpen coaches
Major League Baseball pitchers
Major League Baseball pitching coaches
Memphis Chicks players
Miami Marlins coaches
Omaha Royals players
Osceola Astros players
People from Prosser, Washington
Seattle Mariners coaches
UNLV Rebels baseball players